The 2020 Seoul Dynasty season was the third season of the Seoul Dynasty's existence in the Overwatch League. The Dynasty planned to hold two homestand weekends in the 2020 season at the Dongdaemun Design Plaza in Seoul; however, due to the COVID-19 pandemic, all homestand events were cancelled.

Preceding offseason

Organizational changes 
In October 2019, head coach Kim "KDG" Dong-gun's contract expired, and he did not re-sign with the team. Later that month, Seoul promoted assistant coach Park "changoon" Chang-geun to head coach and brought up Mun "MMA" Seong-won from Gen.G Esports as an assistant coach. The team released assistant coach Lee "WhyNot" Ju-hyeop in early November. On November 8, Seoul signed former Washington Justice head coach Kim "WizardHyeong" Hyeong-seok as a strategic coach.

Roster changes 

The Dynasty enter the new season with three free agents, one player which they have the option to retain for another year, and six players under contract. The OWL's deadline to exercise a team option is November 11, after which any players not retained will become a free agent. Free agency officially began on October 7.

Acquisitions 
The Dynasty's first acquisition of the offseason was on October 22, when they agreed to acquire tank Hong "Gesture" Jae-hee and DPS Park "Profit" Joon-yeong from the London Spitfire. A week later, support Kim "Creative" Young-wan was promoted from Seoul's academy team Gen.G Esports. On January 12, the Dynasty announced the signing of former London Spitfire support player Choi "Bdosin" Seung-tae.

Departures 
The first player to depart from the Dynasty was main support Lee "Jecse" Seung-soo, as he was released from the team on November 1. Two weeks later, it was announced that Seoul transferred DPS Kim "Fleta" Byung-sun to the Shanghai Dragons. On November 23, it was announced that support Lee "Highly" Sung-hyeok had been signed to the London Spitfire. On November 27, veteran support player Ryu "ryujehong" Je-hong was signed to the Vancouver Titans, and three weeks later, Seoul parted ways with off-tank Kim "zunba" Joon-hyeok.

Homestand events 
In December 2019, the Dynasty announced that they would hold two homestand events; both were to be held the Dongdaemun Design Plaza in Seoul. Due to the COVID-19 pandemic in South Korea, the league cancelled the Dynasty's March homestand event that was initially set to be held from March 7 to 8. The game will be made up, with exact dates and times to be announced later.

Roster

Standings

Game log

Regular season

Midseason tournaments 

| style="text-align:center;" | Bonus wins awarded: 3

Postseason

References 

Seoul Dynasty
Seoul Dynasty
Seoul Dynasty seasons